Dr. A. Q. Khan Institute of Computer Sciences and Information Technology commonly known as KICSIT is a sub-campus of Institute of Space Technology located in Kahuta, Rawalpindi, Punjab.Dr. A. Q. Khan Institute of Computer Sciences and Information Technology (KICSIT), Kahuta was inaugurated in November 2000 by Dr. Abdul Qadeer Khan, the founder and then Chairman of KRL.

Background 
Initially, KICSIT offered Bachelor of Science in Computer Science (BSCS) program in affiliation with Gomal University, D I Khan. Later in 2001, 4-year Bachelor of Engineering in Information Technology (BEIT) programme was started in affiliation with University of Engineering and Technology (UET), Taxila. Since Spring 2013 BEIT has been converted into BSIT (Bachelor of Science in Information Technology) which is approved by National Computing Education Accreditations Council (NCEAC). BSIT is run in affiliation with UET Taxila.

Facilities
Electronics and Physics labs have equipment needed for required experiments and training. There is common room for girls students.

Degree programs

BS (CS) 
The Bachelor of Science in Computer Science (BSCS) Degree program is affiliated with University of Engineering & Technology, Taxila. The medium of instruction at KICSIT is English except for Islamic Studies.

Each semester comprises sixteen weeks of teaching. Mid Semester Examination are held after eighth week. The seventeenth week shall be of preparatory holidays for End Semester Examination which shall be held in the eighteenth week.

BS (CE) 
The Bachelor of Science in Computer Engineering (BSCE) Degree program is affiliated with Institute of space technology islamabad and spread over four academic years. Each semester comprises sixteen weeks of teaching. This Program is accredited by Pakistan Engineering Council.

See also
Khan Research Laboratories

References

External links 
 

Engineering universities and colleges in Pakistan
Public universities and colleges in Punjab, Pakistan
Universities and colleges in Rawalpindi District